The Israeli Juggling Convention (IJC) takes place each year during the Passover Holiday. The IJC is the second biggest juggling convention in the world (after the EJC) with around 2000 participants each year.

Summary
Israeli juggling conventions started in the late 80s and then took a break before continuing regularly from the mid-90s. Since 2000, the IJC has been on the same site and has used a consistent format:
 The convention takes place during the intermediary days of Passover.
 Since 2000, the convention has been located in the Gan HaShlosha National Park in the north of Israel near Beit She'an.
 It is a camping convention and the main activities take place in a large on-site gym. There are vendors, workshops, and general practice space available for juggling and many other circus skills.
 The first evening traditionally has a juggling competition named in memory of Avi Rosenberg. For many years it alternated between 3 ball and 3 club opens, but since 2014 it has been a best trick competition with any prop. Winners are voted for by the audience and cash prizes are sponsored by the Rosenberg family.
 The Special Show is a full theater show that varies between artistic, theatrical, technical, and comedy.
 Smaller shows include an open stage, a fire show, renegades, juggle jam, kids shows, a closing show, and sometimes others.
 Starting in 2015, IJC has had a successful parade through the city of Beit Shean.
 The Juggling Olympics is usually one of the last days or nights of the convention. Numerous juggling games and contests are presented. Highlights have included 5 ball endurance, shekel juggling, the "Tournir Yoni" 3 tennis ball combat, club combat, and unicycle combat. In 2015 and 2016 it was held in the Roman amphitheater of the Beit She'an National Park.
 Other competitions held at IJC have included Fight Night, IJA IRC and volley club.
 Many years had an Israeli Show showcasing many of the best Israeli performers.
 The International Gala is on the final evening and is a high quality variety show with about a dozen world-class performers brought in from around the world.
 IJC hosts special and disadvantaged groups to visit the convention and take part in workshops and activities every year.
 Workshops: In 2019 there were over 220 workshops at levels for beginner, intermediate and advanced. There are 10 designated locations, including a covered filed in pool area (3), a shaded ampitheter (2) and the gym (4 + 1 Passing Zone)

Past conventions

Run by volunteers
 IJC is backed by a certified non-profit organization, The Non-Profit for the Advancement of Juggling and Circus in Israel. The convention is run mainly by volunteers (except for some small roles such as security and registration).

See also
 British Juggling Convention
 European Juggling Convention

References

External links

 Juggle Jam IJC 17
Juggling In Israel (Israeli Juggling Convention 2004)
IJC17 promo
9th Israeli Juggling Festival Convention (IJC 2002) Video
10th Israeli Juggling Convention (IJC 2003) Video

Juggling conventions
Annual sporting events in Israel